Partitiviridae is a family of double-stranded RNA viruses. Plants, fungi, and protozoa serve as natural hosts. It has been suggested that they can also infect bacteria. The name comes from the Latin partitius, which means divided, and refers to the segmented genome of partitiviruses. There are five genera and 60 species in the family, 15 of which are unassigned to a genus.

Structure

Viruses in the family Partitiviridae are non-enveloped with icosahedral geometries and T=1 symmetry. The diameter of partitiviruses is around 25–43 nm.

Genome 

Partitiviruses have double-stranded RNA genomes divided into two genomic segments, and there may be additional subgenomic segments. The two genome segments are packaged in separate virus particles. They code for two separate proteins. The first segment codes for the RNA-dependent RNA polymerase (RdRp), and the second segment codes for the coat protein. The segments are around 1.4–3.0 kbp in length, while the total genome length is around 3.0–4.8 kbp.

Life cycle
Viral replication is cytoplasmic. Entry into the host cell is achieved by penetration into the host cell. Replication follows the double-stranded RNA virus replication model. Double-stranded RNA virus transcription is the method of transcription. The virus exits the host cell by cell-to-cell movement. Fungi and plants serve as the natural host. Cryspoviruses infect apicomplexian protozoa of the genus Cryptosporidium, while viruses of the other genera infect plants and fungi. It has been suggested that they can also infect bacteria.

Phylogenetics
Based on the RNA polymerase gene this group can be divided into four clades (I-IV). Four isolates from animals and protozoans form a fifth clade. Clades I–IV consist of mixtures of partitivirus-like sequences from plants and fungi.

Taxonomy

There are five recognized genera within the Partitiviridae family. There are an additional fifteen species in the family unassigned to a genus:

Alphapartitivirus
 Beet cryptic virus 1
 Carrot cryptic virus
 Cherry chlorotic rusty spot associated partitivirus
 Chondrostereum purpureum cryptic virus 1
 Flammulina velutipes browning virus
 Helicobasidium mompa partitivirus V70
 Heterobasidion partitivirus 1
 Heterobasidion partitivirus 3
 Heterobasidion partitivirus 12
 Heterobasidion partitivirus 13
 Heterobasidion partitivirus 15
 Rosellinia necatrix partitivirus 2
 Vicia cryptic virus
 White clover cryptic virus 1

Betapartitivirus
 Atkinsonella hypoxylon virus
 Cannabis cryptic virus
 Ceratocystis resinifera virus 1
 Crimson clover cryptic virus 2
 Dill cryptic virus 2
 Fusarium poae virus 1
 Heterobasidion partitivirus 2
 Heterobasidion partitivirus 7
 Heterobasidion partitivirus 8
 Heterobasidion partitivirus P
 Hop trefoil cryptic virus 2
 Pleurotus ostreatus virus 1
 Primula malacoides virus 1
 Red clover cryptic virus 2
 Rhizoctonia solani virus 717
 Rosellinia necatrix virus 1
 White clover cryptic virus 2

Cryspovirus
 Cryptosporidium parvum virus 1

Deltapartitivirus
 Beet cryptic virus 2
 Beet cryptic virus 3
 Fig cryptic virus
 Pepper cryptic virus 1
 Pepper cryptic virus 2

Gammapartitivirus
 Aspergillus ochraceous virus
 Discula destructiva virus 1
 Discula destructiva virus 2
 Fusarium solani virus 1
 Gremmeniella abietina RNA virus MS1
 Ophiostoma partitivirus 1
 Penicillium stoloniferum virus F
 Penicillium stoloniferum virus S

Unassigned to a genus:
 Agaricus bisporus virus 4
 Alfalfa cryptic virus 1
 Carnation cryptic virus 1
 Carrot temperate virus 1
 Carrot temperate virus 2
 Carrot temperate virus 3
 Carrot temperate virus 4
 Gaeumannomyces graminis virus 0196A
 Gaeumannomyces graminis virus T1A
 Hop trefoil cryptic virus 1
 Hop trefoil cryptic virus 3
 Radish yellow edge virus
 Ryegrass cryptic virus
 Spinach temperate virus
 White clover cryptic virus 3

References

External links
 ICTV Online Report: Partitivirdae
 Viralzone: Partitiviridae

 
Virus families
Riboviria